Simon Francis may refer to:

Simon Francis (footballer) (born 1985), footballer
Simon Francis (cricketer) (born 1978), cricketer

See also